The Damansara–Puchong Expressway (Malay: Lebuhraya Damansara–Puchong) , abbreviated as LDP, is a  major controlled-access highway in the Petaling District of Selangor, Malaysia. The expressway runs in a north–south direction between Bandar Sri Damansara and Putra Permai, near Putrajaya, forming a major thoroughfare in the cities of Petaling Jaya and Puchong. A short east–west spur of the expressway connects Pusat Bandar Puchong to the suburb of UEP Subang Jaya.

Route description
The Damansara–Puchong Expressway begins at the interchange with the Sungai Buloh Highway and Kuala Lumpur Middle Ring Road 2.

The Kelana Jaya line, Sungai Buloh–Kajang line and Sri Petaling line runs alongside substantial portions of the expressway.

History
The construction of the Damansara–Puchong Expressway was awarded to Lingkaran Trans Kota Holdings Bhd (Litrak). On 23 April 1996, the concession agreement was signed between the Government of Malaysia and Litrak for the privatisation of the improvement, upgrading, design, construction, maintenance, operations and management of Damansara–Puchong Expressway.

Construction of the expressway began in September 1996 and completed in December 1998. The work was awarded on a turnkey basis (i.e. design and construct) to Gamuda–Irama Duta Joint Venture (GIDJV) at a cost of RM 1.1 billion. The overall cost for expressway is RM 1.4 billion. The expressway was opened to traffic on 25 January 1999.

With the completion of the Damansara–Puchong Expressway, the Kuala Lumpur Middle Ring Road 2 was substantially completed on the west of Kuala Lumpur which provides for free flow and ease congestion. It also links Bandar Sunway to Puchong and traveling time is shortened between Petaling Jaya and Puchong. The expressways connects the Putrajaya and Hicom/Shah Alam with the Middle Ring Road.

The expressway used to have its own electronic toll collection system known as the "FasTrak". From 1 July 2004, the FasTrak was replaced by the Touch 'n Go and SmartTAG systems.

Original routes
The construction of the Damansara–Puchong Expressway includes the acquisition and upgrades of several major roads as follows:-

Developments

Puchong Jaya interchange
The upgrading works of the Puchong Jaya interchange including ramp from Bukit Jalil Highway to the expressway began in 2002 and was completed in 2005.

Kelana Jaya and Kampung Baru Puchong interchanges
The Kelana Jaya interchange which used to be a U-turn junction was completed in 2007.

The Kampung Baru Puchong interchange was upgraded from underpass to diamond interchange was completed in 2007.

TTDI interchange
The TTDI interchange upgrading project is being undertaken by Lingkaran Trans Kota Holdings Bhd (Litrak) to improve the level of service on LDP.

The project which commenced in August 2007 with a total budget of RM133 million involves widening of certain stretches and building a flyover and an underpass at TTDI Interchange.

The congestion at the interchange is mainly due to multiple weaving of traffic from TTDI to Bandar Utama, TTDI to Damansara Utama and Damansara Utama to TTDI. Once completed, the upgraded interchange will ease traffic flow from TTDI to Bandar Utama/Kepong and there will also be smoother flow on the LDP mainline to Bandar Utama and Kepong.

The upgraded interchange will also allow more green time for localized traffic movement.

The project work involved the following:
Upgrading of existing TTDI Interchange into a fully grade-separated Interchange through the construction of a new 2-lane bridge flyover for northbound traffic towards Kepong
Localised widening of northbound and southbound slip roads
An underpass from TTDI to Bandar Utama and Kepong.

The project was scheduled for full completion in May 2011 with the flyover expected to be opened earlier upon its completion.

Features
A notable feature of the expressway is the LDP Cable-Stayed Bridge on the Freescale Interchange, the first cable-stayed land bridge in Malaysia.
The elevated Sungai Buloh–Kajang MRT line from Mutiara Damansara to Taman Tun Dr Ismail

Notable incidents
1 August 2013 – Chua Boon Huat, Malaysian's national hockey player died in a car accident on Damansara–Puchong Expressway near Kelana Jaya LRT station at Kelana Jaya.

Tolls
The Damansara–Puchong Expressway using opened toll systems.

Electronic Toll Collections (ETC)
As part of an initiative to facilitate faster transactions at the Penchala, PJS, Puchong West and Puchong South Toll Plazas, all toll transactions at four toll plazas on the Damansara–Puchong Expressway have been conducted electronically via Touch 'n Go cards or SmartTAGs since 9 November 2016.

Toll rates
(As of 15 October 2015)

List of interchanges and laybys
The entire expressway is located within the Petaling District in Selangor.

Main Link

Puchong Barat Link

Gallery

See also
 Malaysian expressway system
 Teras Teknologi (TERAS)

References

External links
 Gamuda Group
 LITRAK
 Arup Juruunding Sdn. Bhd

1999 establishments in Malaysia
Expressways and highways in the Klang Valley